Arrigo Solmi (1873–1944) was an Italian legal scholar. He served as the minister of grace and justice between 1934 and 1939 in the cabinet of Benito Mussolini. He was among the pioneers in the establishment of international relations as an academic subject in Italy.

Early life and education
Solmi was born in Finale Emilia on 27 January 1873. In 1895 he graduated from the University of Modena.

Career
Following his graduation Solmi worked at the National Library of Palermo. He taught history of Italian law, international law, and constitutional rights at the University of Cagliari between 1902 and 1906. In 1906 he was promoted to professorship and began to teach at the University of Siena and then at the University of Parma. From 1912 he worked at the University of Pavia of which he served as rector. In October 1925 Solmi joined the National Fascist Party led by Benito Mussolini. In 1924, 1929, 1934 and 1939 he was elected to the Italian Parliament. He was named as the undersecretary of national education in 1932. Between 1935 and 1939 he served as the minister of grace and justice.

Activities 
Solmi was one of the scholars who contributed to the establishment of the Institute for International Political Studies. The others were Carlo Emilio Ferri, Giuseppe Gallavresi and Giorgio Mortara.

Personal life and death
Solmi married Ines Dallari on 28 April 1900. He died in Grottaferrata on 5 March 1944.

Awards
Solmi was the recipient of the following: knight, officer, commander and grand cordon of the Order of the Crown of Italy and knight, officer, grand officer and grand cordon of the Order of Saints Maurice and Lazarus.

References

External links

1873 births
1944 deaths
Italian Ministers of Justice
Mussolini Cabinet
Recipients of the Order of the Crown (Italy)
Recipients of the Order of Saints Maurice and Lazarus
National Fascist Party politicians
University of Modena alumni
Academic staff of the University of Cagliari
Academic staff of the University of Siena
Academic staff of the University of Parma
Academic staff of the University of Pavia
People from the Province of Modena
Heads of universities in Italy
Deputies of Legislature XXVII of the Kingdom of Italy